Poecilia sphenops is a species of fish, of the genus Poecilia, known under the common name molly; to distinguish it from its congeners, it is sometimes called short-finned molly or common molly.  They inhabit fresh water streams and coastal brackish and marine waters from Mexico to Colombia. The wild-type fishes are dull, silvery in color. The molly can produce fertile hybrids with many Poecilia species, most importantly the sailfin molly. The male mollies generally tend to be mildly aggressive.

Mollies rank as one of the most popular feeder fish due to high growth rate, birth size, reproduction, and brood number.

Biology
Mollies are similar in appearance to their livebearer cousins, the platy, swordtail and guppies; the molly tends to be slightly larger and more energetic. Many aquarists note the stronger individuality and aggression in keeping mollies versus platies, who appear much more docile.

Size
Standard size of male fish is 3.2″ (8 cm) and female fish is 4.8″ (12 cm).

Varieties
Selective breeding over centuries has produced several color variations and different body shapes.

Short-finned molly or common molly: They inhabit fresh water streams and coastal brackish and marine waters of Mexico. The wild-type fishes are dull, silvery in color. The molly can produce fertile hybrids with many Poecilia species, most importantly the sailfin molly. The wild form is in fact quite rarely kept, as it has a rather plain silvery coloration suffused with brown and green hues.
Black molly: It is a melanistic breed which are black all over. It is one of the most well-known aquarium fishes and nearly as easy to keep and prolific as guppies.
White molly: A white colored molly.
Golden molly: Nicknamed the "24 karat".
Balloon molly: This fish has a deformed spine due to a genetic defect that gives it its appearance. Through selective breeding it is now widely available. Balloon mollies can still reproduce and live a normal life comparable to that of other mollies, but it has garnered controversy due to the belief that its defect gives it a shortened lifespan and a susceptibility to health problems. 
Lyretail: A breed with an altered caudal fin structure.
Dalmatian molly: A silver colored breed with black speckles.

Gallery

References

 
 

 "Mollies Fish" Detailed information on raising the Molly fish. January 2022 version

sphenops
Fish described in 1846
Vertebrates of Mexico
Live-bearing fish
Ovoviviparous fish
Taxa named by Achille Valenciennes